Mangamila is a large town in the Analamanga Region, Madagascar,  69 km north-east of the capital Antananarivo, in the district of Anjozorobe.

It has a population of 14,640 inhabitants in 2018.

Routes
The town is linked with Antananarivo by the National Road 3.

Economy
The economy is based on agriculture.  Rice, corn, peanuts, beans, manioc, soja and oignons are the main crops.

References

Populated places in Analamanga